A dental prosthesis is an intraoral (inside the mouth) prosthesis used to restore (reconstruct) intraoral defects such as missing teeth, missing parts of teeth, and missing soft or hard structures of the jaw and palate. Prosthodontics is the dental specialty that focuses on dental prostheses. Such prostheses are used to rehabilitate mastication (chewing), improve aesthetics, and aid speech. A dental prosthesis may be held in place by connecting to teeth or dental implants, by suction, or by being held passively by surrounding muscles.  Like other types of prostheses, they can either be fixed permanently or removable; fixed prosthodontics and removable dentures are made in many variations. Permanently fixed dental prostheses use dental adhesive or screws, to attach to teeth or dental implants. Removal prostheses may use friction against parallel hard surfaces and undercuts of adjacent teeth or dental implants, suction using the mucous retention (with or without aid from denture adhesives), and by exploiting the surrounding muscles and anatomical contours of the jaw to passively hold in place.

Examples

Some examples of dental prostheses include:

 dentures
 partial denture
 palatal obturator
 orthodontic appliance
 dental implant
 crown
 bridge

See also 

 Prosthodontics
 Dental restoration
 Dental braces

References 

Dentistry
Prosthetics
Prosthodontology